The Pécs Power Station is one of Hungary's largest biomass power stations, with an installed electrical capacity of 200 MW. Two units of 35 MW, and one unit of 65 MW, uses natural gas as fuel, whereas the fourth 65 MW unit burns wood (biomass).

References

External links 

 Veolia Environnement acquires Hungary's largest biomass power plant

Biomass power stations in Hungary
Buildings and structures in Pécs